Tamão was a trade settlement set up by the Portuguese on an island in the Pearl River Delta, China. This was the first time Europeans reached China via the sea route around the Cape of Good Hope. The settlement lasted from 1514 to 1521, when the Portuguese were expelled by the Ming dynasty navy.

Location 
In May 1513, the Portuguese explorer Jorge Álvares arrived on the Chinese coast at an island in the Pearl River Delta, which they called "Tamão", which is understood to be a corruption of "Tyunmun", the name for the western Hong Kong and Shenzhen area. Chinese sources state that the Portuguese settled around the Tunmen Inlet, but the current whereabouts of the Tyunmun Inlet is unknown, so the precise location of the Portuguese settlement remains a matter of debate among historians.

Rendered in Chinese, the name is identical to the Tuen Mun district in present-day Hong Kong. This leads some researchers to link the Tyunmun of Ming times to Tuen Mun in the New Territories of Hong Kong. "Tyunmun Inlet" would then refer to one of two bays around Tuen Mun: Castle Peak Bay, next to the current Tuen Mun New Town; or Deep Bay between the New Territories and Nantou in present-day Shenzhen, where a Ming coastal defense force was stationed.

One source specifically states that the settlement was at the "bay of Tyunmun ... now called Castle Peak". This merely adds to the confusion since the description in Portuguese sources clearly stated that Tamão was an island. As Tuen Mun is not an island, some researchers have proposed that Tamão may actually refer to one of the nearby islands. Nei Lingding Island has been identified by J. M. Braga to be the Tamão of the Portuguese sources, and is widely followed by Western scholarship; however, recent Chinese scholarship has argued that this identification is insufficiently supported by historical evidence, and suggests a number of other potential islands, such as the nearby Chek Lap Kok or the larger Lantau Island.

In 1521, the settlement was abandoned after the Battle of Tunmen with the Chinese navy; the Portuguese gathered in Malacca in Malaysia.

According to sources quoted by National Geographic, "Macau may never have existed if not for Tamão" where the Portuguese learned valuable lessons about "how China, the Pearl River Delta, and the South China Sea worked".

See also 
 Tuen Mun
 Macau
 History of Macau
 Shuangyu
 Shangchuan Island
 Lampacau
 Luso-Chinese agreement (1554)

References 

1510s in China
1520s in China
1510s in Portugal
1520s in Portugal
History of Hong Kong
New Territories
Ming dynasty
China–Portugal relations
Populated places established in 1514
1521 disestablishments
History of Guangdong
2nd millennium in Hong Kong